Pat Battle (born December 9, 1959) is an American journalist. Since 1996, she has been at WNBC-TV.

Early life
Patricia (nickname, "Pat") N. Battle was born December 9, 1959.
Of African-American descent, she grew up in Neptune Township, New Jersey, where her mother was a member of the township committee and served as police commissioner. She graduated from Neptune High School in 1977, where she had been a cheerleader. Her first job was with the Asbury Park Press as a reporter.

Career
Battle won a 2005 New York Regional Emmy Award for Political Programming for her work on the U.S. presidential primary edition of WNBC-TV's What Matters.

She appeared as herself on the Netflix series, Unbreakable Kimmy Schmidt and is set to appear in a second-season episode of Peacock's Girls5eva.

Personal life
Battle is a resident of Teaneck, New Jersey, and is married to Anthony Johnson, a reporter with WABC-TV, a competing New York City television station. In October 2010, she publicly revealed that she had been diagnosed with breast cancer and undergone a lumpectomy.

Filmography

Film

Television

See also

 List of American print journalists
 List of people from Teaneck, New Jersey
 List of people from New York City
 List of people from Philadelphia
 List of television reporters
 List of University of Maryland, College Park people

References

External links
 

1959 births
Place of birth missing (living people)
20th-century American women writers
21st-century American women writers
American newspaper journalists
Journalists from New Jersey
Living people
Television anchors from New York City
Neptune High School alumni
People from Neptune Township, New Jersey
People from Teaneck, New Jersey
Philadelphia television reporters
American women non-fiction writers
20th-century American non-fiction writers
21st-century American non-fiction writers
American women television journalists